Colin Philp Sr. (born 4 November 1947) is an Australian-born sailor from Fiji. He represented his country at the 1988 Summer Olympics in Busan, South Korea as crew member in the Soling. With helmsman David Ashby and fellow crew member Colin Dunlop, they finished in 19th place. At the 1992 Summer Olympics in Barcelona, Spain as helmsman and with fellow crew members Colin Dunlop and David Philp the team took 23rd place.

References

External links
 

Living people
1936 births
Sportspeople from Hobart
Australian emigrants to Fiji
Fijian people of Australian descent
Australian male sailors (sport)
Fijian male sailors (sport)
Sailors at the 1984 Summer Olympics – Tornado
Sailors at the 1988 Summer Olympics – Soling
Sailors at the 1992 Summer Olympics – Soling
Olympic sailors of Fiji